The Sord M5 is a home computer launched by Sord Computer Corporation in 1982. Primarily the Sord M5 competed in the Japanese home computer market. It was also sold as the CGL M5 in the United Kingdom by Computer Games Limited and was reasonably popular in Czechoslovakia, where the M5 stood as one of the first affordable computers available to the general public. Takara also sold models in Japan as the Game M5, and models were also exported to South Korea.

Original models of the Sord M5 are relatively small by home computing standards, with a built-in keyboard with rubber keys, similar to the ZX Spectrum, which is also sold in many countries such as the United Kingdom itself, Ireland, Spain, the Netherlands, Singapore, Malaysia, Sweden, Norway, Denmark, Canada, New Zealand, Australia, Greece, Israel and Hong Kong as the Sord M5 Creative Computer, which included a carrying case for the computer. The specifications of the computer are very similar to the MSX, a computer that likely forced the Sord M5 (along with many similar Japanese computers) out of the market by the mid-1980s.

The CGL M5 was released in the UK with an introductory price of £195, higher than many of the system's competitors including the ZX Spectrum, and VIC-20. Whereas the M5 contained a cartridge slot in an age where most computers were using compact cassettes or floppy disks, the small amount of built-in RAM led to few games being produced for the system.

In South Korea, three electronics companies released different personal computers based on Sord M5. The FC-150 was produced and released by LG, Samsung released the SPC-500, and the TommyCom was manufactured and launched by Koryo Systems. These computers supported the Korean alphabet, Hangul. The system specifications of these computers were identical to the original M5, but they had differently shaped cartridge slots. Cartridges from the Sord M5 or other manufacturers could not be used for these computers directly. LG released some original software including several educational programs and games.

Despite its short production run, the M5 was supported by various big Japanese game developers such as Namco and Konami.

Other models include the M5 Pro and M5 Jr.

Technical specifications

Internal hardware 
 CPU: Zilog Z80, 3.58 MHz
 Video Hardware: TMS9918
 40×24 text (6×8 characters), 224 user defined characters
 256×192 graphics, 16 colours
 32 hardware sprites (up to 16×16 pixels)
 Sound Hardware: SN76489
 3 sound channels
 1 noise channel
 6 octaves, 15 amplitude levels
 RAM: 20 kB (of which 16kB is screen memory)
 ROM: 8 kB expandable to 16kB

I/O ports and power supply
I/O ports:
 TV out
 Video out (phono socket)
 Sound out (phono socket)
 Centronics 16-pin interface
 8-pin DIN cassette connector
 Power supply: external

Language cartridge options
 BASIC-I
 Integer arithmetic only (16 bit signed)
 BASIC-G
 Graphics and sound functions
 BASIC-F
 Floating point arithmetic
 FALC
 Applications package

Retail price
 UK Retail prices, December 1983 
 Sord M5 plus BASIC-I : £190
 BASIC-G : £35
 BASIC-F : £35
 FALC: £35

References

External links
 Infos and photos Sord M5
 More M5 images including circuit board
 Sord M5 at old-computers.com 

Z80-based home computers
Home computers
Products introduced in 1982